Wyoming Highway 334 (WYO 334) is a  east-west Wyoming State Road in central Sheridan County that connects Wyoming Highway 332 with the business routes of I-90/US 14/US 87. In turn, those connect to exit 25 of Interstate 90 as well as US 14 and US 87.

Route description
Wyoming Highway 334 begins its western end at Wyoming Highway 332 (Big Horn Avenue) and travels east for just under eight-tenths of a mile to end at an intersection with I-90 BUS/US 14 BUS/US 87 BUS. Exit 25 of Interstate 90 can be reached by continuing east along I-90 BUS/US 14 BUS/US 87 BUS another .

The roadway itself continues west of WYO 332 as Sheridan County Route 34 to connect to Wyoming Highway 333 (Airport Road) and the Sheridan County Airport.

Major intersections

References

External links 

Wyoming State Routes 300-399

Transportation in Sheridan County, Wyoming
334